Paulette del Baye (1877 – 23 May 1945), born Catalina Francisca Paulina Batalla, was a French actress, singer, dancer and vaudeville performer from Cuba.

Career
Paulette del Baye performed as "La commère au bois" in the revue at the Moulin Rouge in 1904. "Paulette del Baye est une comédienne fine, une chanteuse spirituelle, une danseuse exquise, qui fait de véritables tours de force d'art en souriant," said one report about the revue. She created the role of "Zézé" in Vous n'avez rien a declarer? (1906) at the Théâtre des Nouveautés, and also appeared in Les plaques de l'Année (1906) in Paris. In London, she was seen in More (1916), Arlette (1917), and The Passing Show of 1918 (1918). In 1917 a comic opera was based on her life, and named Paulette del Baye.

Paulette del Baye's film credits included four silent pictures from 1921: Greatheart, Frailty, The Fruitful Vine, and The Woman with the Fan; she also appeared in the Sherlock Holmes adventure The Man with the Twisted Lip.

Other activities
In 1909, she was one of the "fair actresses" implicated in a plot to restore the French monarchy, "but in these days of automobiles and swift yachts," one report explained, "it is exceedingly difficult to follow the lead of the young and charming Mlle. del Baye".

Personal life
Paulette del Baye held the title Comtesse de Brioude. She died in England in 1945.

References

External links
 

1877 births
1945 deaths
French countesses
French actresses
Vaudeville performers
Cuban emigrants to France
French expatriates in the United Kingdom